The 16th Annual Demographia International Housing Affordability Survey: 2020 analyzed affordability in 8 Anglophone countries. Among this sample, the housing markets with the least affordable real estate prices are Hong Kong, Vancouver, and Sydney. The top three housing markets with the most affordable real estate prices based on major housing markets are Rochester, New York, Cleveland, Ohio, and Oklahoma City, Oklahoma. This survey was performed by Demographia, a global analysis firm.

Methodology 
The prices are based on data from the third quarter of 2019. The housing markets ranked are located in Australia, Canada, Hong Kong, Ireland, New Zealand, Singapore, United Kingdom, and the United States. The report also includes special coverage on Russia.

The housing markets are ranked on middle income housing affordability, which uses the "median multiple". This was calculated by taking the median house price divided by the median gross pre-tax household income of the housing market. The median multiple is used widely for analyzing housing markets and is recommended by the World Bank and the United Nations. It has also been used by the Joint Center for Housing Studies at Harvard University.

Demographia uses housing affordability ratings to categorize each housing market's median multiple.

List 
The report is split into two rankings, one for major housing markets, and one for all housing markets. The list below shows the rankings from the most unaffordable housing market to the most affordable housing market for the major housing markets. The list contains 92 housing markets.

See also 
 Real estate
 Affordable housing

References 

Real estate lists
Geography-related lists